L.A. Without a Map (also known as Los Angeles Without a Map and I Love L.A.) is a 1998 romantic comedy-drama film directed by Mika Kaurismäki, from a screenplay he co-wrote with Richard Rayner, based on Rayner's 1988 semi-autobiographical novel Los Angeles Without a Map. The film stars David Tennant, Vinessa Shaw, Julie Delpy and Vincent Gallo, with Cameron Bancroft and Joe Dallesandro. It is an international co-production between France, the United Kingdom, Finland and Luxembourg.

Plot
While visiting the Northern English city of Bradford, Barbara, an aspiring Hollywood actress has a fling with the town undertaker Richard. Barbara returns home and brags about the handsome writer she met while away. Unable to forget about her, Richard promptly leaves Bradford and goes to Hollywood without announcing it to his fiancé. Barbara is shocked and embarrassed to see Richard in Los Angeles.

With the help of a man called Moss, Richard finds an apartment and a job while he waits for Barbara to break up with her jealous boyfriend Patterson. Barbara finally calls; she and Richard go to the beach and she tells Richard that, although she likes him, it's safer for her future career if she stays with Patterson. In response, he tells her that he'd have gone to the North Pole for her.

Richard takes Barbara to a club, where Moss and his band (Leningrad Cowboys) are playing. Richard introduces Moss to Barbara's waitress friend Julie and the two get along famously. Meanwhile, Barbara sees Patterson getting too friendly with the Head Waitress at the restaurant and leaves him. Richard, Barbara, Moss and Julie spend the night on the road, before Moss and Julie leave to spend time together in a hotel. Barbara agrees to marry him and the pair have a wedding in Las Vegas.

Barbara arranges a meeting for Richard with Takowsky, a well-known screenwriting agent. Richard hands over his screenplay, Uzi Suicide, and returns home to work on more script ideas. Patterson casts Barbara in his next film on the condition that he have sex with her. She agrees and separates from Richard.

Richard visits Barbara's restaurant, where her coworker Julie tells him that Barbara doesn't wish to see him anymore. He overhears that Barbara will be waiting tables at a party later and is advised by the restaurant's owner that if he can't win Barbara back, then he should kill her. Instead, Richard acquires a drug to knock her unconscious in case he cannot convince her to return to his side. Moss accompanies him to the party and finds Barbara. After an argument, Richard whips out the drug, but Barbara hits him in the face knocking him to the ground.

Richard spends the night in prison and is released with the help of Takowsky. He returns to Bradford, where his funeral business has been kept afloat by a colleague. Barbara brings back Uzi Suicide, with the news that Takowsky has agreed to take Richard on as a client. She presents Richard with his first pay check and they decide to patch up their relationship, starting afresh in Bradford.

Cast

Production
Locations in the film include Chapel Street in Little Germany, Bradford; Undercliffe Cemetery, Forster Square and the Midland Hotel in Bradford; The Queen's Hotel pub at 195 Lumb Lane, Bradford; The Rex Cinema in Elland, West Yorkshire; Dean Clough in Halifax, West Yorkshire; the Yamashiro Historic District, EIDC and Guitar Center in Los Angeles; Malibu SpeedZone in Industry, California; Hollywood Park Casino in Inglewood, California; and The Argyle Hotel on Sunset Strip in West Hollywood, California.

References

External links
 
 
 

1998 films
1998 comedy-drama films
1998 romantic comedy-drama films
1990s British films
1990s English-language films
1990s French films
British romantic comedy-drama films
English-language Finnish films
English-language French films
Films based on autobiographical novels
Films based on British novels
Films directed by Mika Kaurismäki
Films set in Bradford
Films set in Los Angeles
Films shot in Bradford
Films shot in the Las Vegas Valley
Films shot in Los Angeles
Films shot in West Yorkshire
Finnish comedy-drama films
Finnish romantic comedy films
Finnish romantic drama films
French romantic comedy-drama films
Luxembourgian comedy-drama films
Luxembourgian romantic comedy films
Luxembourgian romantic drama films